The Re 450 is a push-pull electric locomotive passenger coach type which is used by Swiss Federal Railways on S-Bahn services in Zürich. Under the old Swiss class system, they would have been known as Re 4/4V. They are only found working with formations of three double-deck passenger carriages, the rear-most of which has a driving cab to allow push-pull working. At peak times trainsets may be coupled together to form a train consisting of three locomotives and nine passenger vehicles. Most S-Bahn lines use this stock and it is the most common on the network. 

The trains are also known as DPZ, short for double-decker push-pull train, and is the first double decker train type operated by SBB-CFF-FFS.

All Re 450 coaches received a mid-life refurbishment at the SBB-CFF-FFS workshops at Yverdon-les-Bains between 2011 and 2018.

See also
List of stock used by Swiss Federal Railways

References

External links
 
 DPZ on Swiss Federal Railways

Re 450
Electric locomotives of Switzerland
Bo′Bo′ locomotives
SLM locomotives
15 kV AC locomotives
Standard gauge locomotives of Switzerland
Railway locomotives introduced in 1989